Arthur Ward Thomas (25 January 1881 – 7 May 1965) was a New Zealand cricketer who played first-class cricket for Canterbury from 1911 to 1922.

Cricket career
Arthur Thomas was an all-rounder: a lower-order or middle-order batsman who bowled medium-pace. He was the outstanding player of the Plunket Shield match in January 1915 when Canterbury beat Auckland in Auckland. Replacing the injured Duncan McLachlan in the team, he did not bowl in Auckland’s first innings, then made 41 at number nine to take Canterbury’s first innings from 124 for 7 to 208 all out. He then took the first seven wickets in Auckland’s second innings and finished with figures of 8 for 99, the best figures recorded for the Plunket Shield at that time. He then contributed 20 at number eight to Canterbury’s one-wicket victory.

He made his highest score in Canterbury's victory over Wellington in the 1919-20 Plunket Shield. After dismissing Wellington for 239, Canterbury were 160 for 6 when Thomas went to the wicket. He made 83 not out, the highest score of the match, and took Canterbury's total to 350. He then took 3 for 25 as Wellington made only 153 in their second innings, and Canterbury went on to win by seven wickets.

Personal life
On 29 April 1903 Thomas married Esther Boulton at her parents’ home in Charing Cross, a small farming settlement west of Christchurch. She died in January 1945. He died in 1965.

References

External links
 
 Arthur Thomas at CricketArchive

1881 births
1965 deaths
New Zealand cricketers
Canterbury cricketers
Cricketers from Christchurch